Daulat Gunaji Gawai (born 1 June 1929) in (Shirpur) Buldhana district was a member of the 6th Lok Sabha of India. He represented the Buldhana constituency of Maharashtra and was a member of the [[Republican Party of India ](all indian Republican party]( अखिल भारतीय रिपब्लिकन पक्ष)  political party.

References

India MPs 1977–1979
1953 births
Living people
Marathi politicians
Republican Party of India politicians
Republican Party of India (Khobragade) politicians
Lok Sabha members from Maharashtra
People from Buldhana district
People from Dhule district
Bharatiya Janata Party politicians from Maharashtra